Jose Luis Alves is a Portuguese former footballer who played as a forward.

Career  
Alves played in the Primeira Divisão in 1968 with Atlético Clube de Portugal. In 1969, he played abroad in the National Soccer League with Toronto First Portuguese. In his debut season with Toronto he assisted in securing the NSL Championship. In 1970, he assisted Toronto in securing the NSL Cup by scoring a goal against Toronto Hellas. He returned to play with First Portuguese for the 1971 season. 

In July, 1971 he was loaned to the Toronto Metros of the North American Soccer League because of a player shortage due to inquires. He played in a friendly match with the Metros against Apollon Smyrnis F.C.  on July 28, 1971.

References  
 

 
Living people
Association football forwards
Portuguese footballers
Atlético Clube de Portugal players
Toronto First Portuguese players
Primeira Liga players
Canadian National Soccer League players
Portuguese expatriate footballers
Expatriate soccer players in Canada
Portuguese expatriate sportspeople in Canada
Year of birth missing (living people)